Ankeny was a town in Adams County, Washington. The GNIS classifies it as a populated place.

The community was named after Senator Levi Ankeny.

References

Ghost towns in Washington (state)
Geography of Adams County, Washington